Galactose-3-O-sulfotransferase 2 is an enzyme that in humans is encoded by the GAL3ST2 gene.

This gene encodes a member of the galactose-3-O-sulfotransferase protein family. The product of this gene catalyzes sulfonation by transferring a sulfate group to the hydroxyl at C-3 of nonreducing beta-galactosyl residues, and it can act on both type 1 and type 2 (Galbeta 1-3/1-4GlcNAc-R) oligosaccharides with similar efficiencies, and on core 1 glycans. This enzyme has been implicated in tumor metastasis processes. This gene is different from the GAL3ST3 gene located on chromosome 11, which has also been referred to as GAL3ST2 and encodes a related enzyme with distinct tissue distribution and substrate specificities, compared to galactose-3-O-sulfotransferase 2.

References

Further reading